Houston Branch is a  long tributary to Marshyhope Creek that rises in western Sussex County, Delaware and flows west into Caroline County, Maryland.

See also
List of Delaware rivers
List of rivers of Maryland

References

Rivers of Delaware
Rivers of Maryland
Rivers of Sussex County, Delaware
Rivers of Caroline County, Maryland